Innerprise Software Inc, was a North American video game developer and publisher located in Maryland. The company was founded in 1989 and went out of business in 1992. During the company's existence Innerprise Software managed to publish titles for the Amiga Home Computer and Sega Genesis in North America and Europe.

Video games

References

Defunct video game companies of the United States
Video game companies established in 1989
Video game companies disestablished in 1992
Video game development companies
Defunct companies based in Maryland